End Hill is the northernmost top of the Malvern Hills that runs approximately  north-south along the Herefordshire-Worcestershire border. It lies north of Table Hill and north-northwest of North Hill.

References

Hills of Worcestershire
Malvern Hills
Malvern, Worcestershire